Honthem is a hamlet in the Limburg province of the Netherlands, about 7 km from Maastricht.

It was the first mentioned in 1375 as Huynthem, and means "settlement of Hundo (person)".

Honthem has placed name signs. It was home to 127 people in 1840.

Gallery

References 

Populated places in Limburg (Netherlands)
Eijsden-Margraten